Dr. Sara Lea Sawyer is a professor at the University of Colorado Boulder. She has received national and international prizes in virology. In 2011 she was as awarded the Presidential Early Career Award for Scientists and Engineers (PECASE) by President Barack Obama at the White House. She serves as a Senior Editor at the journal eLIFE, and as a government consultant on the topic of pandemic preparedness. In 2020, she co-founded Darwin Biosciences, an infectious disease diagnostics company located in Boulder, Colorado. Her research focuses on animal viruses that infect humans, including the emergent viruses HIV-1 and SARS-CoV-2.

Early life and education 
Sawyer was born in Olathe, Kansas. She was an undergraduate student at the University of Kansas, where she majored in Chemical Engineering. As an undergraduate she worked on fuel cell technology. After graduating, Sawyer worked in the oil industry as an offshore drilling engineer in the Gulf of Mexico. She moved to Cornell University for her graduate studies, where she studied DNA replication. Sawyer was a postdoctoral fellow with Harmit Malik and Micheal Emerman at the Fred Hutchinson Cancer Research Center in Seattle, WA.

Research and career 
From 2008 to 2014, Sawyer was a professor at the University of Texas Austin. In 2015, she moved to the University of Colorado Boulder with her research team. There, they joined the BioFrontiers Institute.

During the COVID-19 pandemic, Sawyer investigated how SARS-CoV-2 spreads between infected people. As part of this effort, she developed a fast, cheap and easy COVID-19 screening test. The test was based on a Reverse Transcription Loop-mediated Isothermal Amplification (RT-LAMP). She analyzed COVID test samples collected from students and staff at the University of Colorado Boulder between August and November 2021. She found that only 2% of COVID patients were responsible for 90% of the circulating virus.

Awards and honors 

 2019  Lab Venture Challenge Winner 
 2018  Richard M. Elliott Award in Virology (University of Glasgow, Scotland)
 2018  Avant-Garde award from NIH NIDA
 2013  UT Austin College of Natural Sciences Teaching Excellence Award
 2013  Burroughs Wellcome Fund Investigator in the Pathogenesis of Infectious Disease
 2012  Named “Professor of Excellence” at UT Austin
 2011  Presidential Early Career Award for Scientists and Engineers (PECASE)
 2011  Kavli Fellow of the National Academy of Sciences
 2009  Alfred P. Sloan Fellow in Computational and Evolutionary Molecular Biology
 2007  Andy Kaplan Prize in Retrovirology
 2006  Burroughs Wellcome Career Award in the Biomedical Sciences
 2005  NIH National Research Service Award (NRSA) post-doctoral fellowship
 2004  NIH Postdoctoral Training Grant
 2000  Graduate Research Award - Cornell Dept. of Molecular Biology and Genetics

Selected publications 
A list of publications can be viewed on Dr. Sawyer's Google Scholar page.

References 

Living people
Year of birth missing (living people)
University of Colorado Boulder faculty
American women biologists
Cornell University alumni
University of Kansas alumni
People from Olathe, Kansas
21st-century American women